Marshall Ridge is a ridge to the east of Blue Glacier on the Scott Coast of Victoria Land, Antarctica, running east–west and rising to about  between Garwood Valley and Marshall Valley. The feature was almost surely observed in 1903 by the Koettlitz Glacier party led by Lieutenant A.B. Armitage of the British National Antarctic Expedition, but it was first clearly mapped by Captain Robert F. Scott's second expedition, the British Antarctic Expedition, 1910–13. The ridge was named in association with Marshall Valley by the New Zealand Antarctic Place-Names Committee in 1982.

References

Ridges of Victoria Land
Scott Coast